The Florida State University College of Nursing, is the nursing school of the Florida State University. About 553 students are enrolled in classes, including undergraduates and graduate students. All programs are accredited by the Commission on Collegiate Nursing Education.

History
The College was founded in 1950 and is the first nationally accredited baccalaureate degree program in nursing in the state of Florida.

College of Nursing today 
A demanding program, incoming freshmen nursing students present a GPA of 3.5 or higher.  Upper division students admitted to the College present a GPA average of 3.78.  The College of Nursing has been approved by the Florida Board of Nursing since 1950.  It has been accredited by the National League for Nursing since the first class graduated in 1952.  The program is accredited by the Commission on Collegiate Nursing Education (CCNE).  Approximately 120 undergraduate students are admitted to the BSN program at the college in the fall.

Florida State's Nursing graduates have a 97.8% passage rate on the state Nursing certification examination.  One hundred percent of the College of Nursing's Advanced Nurse Practitioner master's degree graduates earn national specialty certification.

Institutes and centers
The Tallahassee Memorial HealthCare Center for Research and Evidence Based Practice is a collaborative research center focused on the optimization of health outcomes for patients, their families and the community. The Center provides a physical space and resources to support the integration of the ongoing collaboration between the TMH staff, the faculty of the College of Nursing and collaborators from other university units.

Facilities
A variety of clinical laboratory settings are utilized for meaningful learning experiences at the College of Nursing. The College of Nursing Simulation Laboratories, Tallahassee Memorial HealthCare, Capital Regional Medical Center, Florida State Hospital, Archbold Medical Center in Thomasville, GA, county health departments, and other agencies in Leon County, Florida and surrounding counties are used for the clinical component of the program. In addition, Wolfson Children’s Hospital in Jacksonville, Florida is used for pediatric clinicals. Internship clinical sites are available in partnership with acute care facilities. All experiences are under the direction of the faculty of Florida State University’s College of Nursing.

National rankings
U.S. News & World Report (2016 edition)
Nursing Schools: Doctor of Nursing Practice - 110th
Nursing Schools: Master's - 133rd
Online Graduate Nursing - 54th overall
Online Master of Science - 10th overall

References

External links

 
Nursing schools in Florida
Educational institutions established in 1950
1950 establishments in Florida